Chloe Smith (born 2 March 1999), known under the ring name Dani Luna, is an English professional wrestler currently working as a freelancer. From 2019 to 2022, she was signed to WWE where she performed on the NXT UK brand.

Professional wrestling career

Early career (2016–2020)
Smith made her wrestling debut on 3 December 2016, under her real name, and wrestled in the English promotion Evolution, where she was defeated by Lana Austin. Two months later, she reappeared in Evolution, losing a 2 on 1 handicap match to Mya Mae and Sierra Loxton. In 2017, she made her debut for British Empire Wrestling. After a few losses, she decided to appear in various other promotions such as Preston City Wrestling, Dragon Pro Wrestling, International Pro Wrestling: United Kingdom and Pro Wrestling Chaos. During this time she was able to win three titles.

WWE (2019–2022)  
Luna made her WWE debut on the 3 July 2019 episode of NXT UK, teaming with Mercedez Blaze in a 2 on 1 handicap loss to Jazzy Gabert. She appeared again on the 31 July episode, where she lost to Rhea Ripley. On the 25 September episode of NXT UK, Luna lost to Nina Samuels for a third time.

On 31 January 2020, Luna signed a contract with WWE. On the February 6 episode of NXT UK, she lost to Piper Niven. On the 12 March episode of NXT UK, she defeated Amale by disqualification when she was attacked by NXT UK Women's Champion Kay Lee Ray. On the 19 March episode of NXT UK, she challenged Ray for the NXT UK Women's Championship but lost the match. On the 2 April episode of NXT UK, Dani and Niven lost to Jinny and Ray. On 18 August 2022, it was announced that Luna had been released from her WWE contract.

Revolution Pro Wrestling (2022–present) 
On 17 December at RevPro Uprising, Luna won the Southside Women's Championship after defeating Kanji.

Championships and accomplishments 
Dragon Pro Wrestling
Celtic Crown Women's Championship (1 time)
Pro Wrestling Chaos
Maiden Of Chaos Championship (1 time)
Pro Wrestling SOUL
SOUL Women's Championship (1 time)
Revolution Pro Wrestling
Southside Women's Championship (1 time, current)

References

External links 
 
 

1999 births
Living people
People from Croydon
Sportspeople from London
English female professional wrestlers
20th-century English women
21st-century English women
21st-century professional wrestlers